Megan Mullally (born November 12, 1958) is an American actress, comedian, and singer. She is best known for playing Karen Walker on the NBC sitcom Will & Grace (1998–2006, 2017–2020), for which she received eight Primetime Emmy Award nominations for Outstanding Supporting Actress in a Comedy Series, winning twice, in 2000 and 2006. She also received nominations for numerous other accolades for her portrayal, including seven consecutive Screen Actors Guild Awards nominations for Outstanding Performance by a Female Actor in a Comedy Series, winning three times, in 2001, 2002, and 2003, as well as receiving four Golden Globe Award nominations.

From 2006 to 2007, Mullally hosted the talk show The Megan Mullally Show. Since then, she has been a series regular on several television series, such as In the Motherhood, Party Down, Childrens Hospital, and Breaking In. She has also appeared in guest spots and recurring roles on other comedy series including, Happy Endings, Bob's Burgers, Parks and Recreation, 30 Rock, Up All Night, Boston Legal, and The New Adventures of Old Christine. In addition to television, Mullally has also ventured into film, with appearances in Smashed (2012), The Kings of Summer (2013), and Why Him? (2016).

Early life 
Mullally was born in Los Angeles, California, the daughter of Martha (née Palmer) and Carter Mullally, Jr., an actor who was a contract player with Paramount Pictures in the 1950s. Mullally moved to her father's native Oklahoma City, Oklahoma, at age six. She is of English, Irish and Scandinavian ancestry. She studied ballet from age six and performed at the Oklahoma City Ballet during high school, also studying at the School of American Ballet in New York City.

Following her graduation from Casady School in Oklahoma City, Mullally attended Northwestern University in Evanston, Illinois, where she studied English literature and art history. After her sophomore year, she began acting in theater in downtown Chicago. By junior year, she was performing in eight shows per week. She later dropped out of Northwestern to pursue acting.

Career

Television 
One of Mullally's earliest acting spots was on a McDonald's commercial that also featured John Goodman. She made her series debut in 1986 in The Ellen Burstyn Show. She subsequently guest-starred on sitcoms such as Seinfeld, Frasier, Wings, Herman's Head, Ned and Stacey, Mad About You, Caroline in the City, 3rd Rock from the Sun and Just Shoot Me!. She played a central character in a season-five episode of Murder, She Wrote, "Coal Miner's Slaughter", recalling in 2012, "I hadn't gotten a job for so long, and I was in a complete panic because I didn't know how I was going to pay my rent. So I get a call one day from my agent that I'd gotten offered a guest role, and it paid $5,000. I literally fell down onto my knees and testified and wept. I played some former protégée of Jessica Fletcher. It's one of my favorite things I've ever shot."

In 1989, Mullally tested for the role of Elaine Benes on Seinfeld. The role was eventually given to Julia Louis-Dreyfus. In 1998, Mullally landed the role of Karen Walker, Grace Adler's abrasive, pill-popping assistant, in the NBC sitcom Will & Grace. She won the Primetime Emmy Award for Outstanding Supporting Actress in a Comedy Series in both 2000 and 2006, and was nominated in 2001, 2002, 2003, 2004, 2005 and again for the revival in 2018. She won the Screen Actors Guild Award for Outstanding Performance by a Female Actor in a Comedy Series three times, in 2002, 2003 and 2004, and with cast members Eric McCormack, Debra Messing, and Sean Hayes, she shared the Screen Actors Guild Award for Outstanding Performance by an Ensemble in a Comedy Series in 2001. She is the first of only two actresses to win a SAG Award three years in a row. She was nominated each year from 2000 until 2003 for the Golden Globe Award for Best Supporting Actress – Series, Miniseries or Television Film.

In 2005, Mullally saw comedian and actor Bill Hader performing with his Second City class in Los Angeles, and shortly thereafter brought Hader to the attention of Saturday Night Live producer Lorne Michaels. Also in 2005, Mullally was awarded the Women in Film Lucy Award in recognition of her "innovation in creative works that have enhanced the perception of women through the medium of television".

Following Will & Grace, Mullally hosted her own talk show, The Megan Mullally Show from 2006 to 2007. She has hosted Saturday Night Live, guest-hosted the Late Show with David Letterman, hosted the 2006 TV Land Awards, and been a featured performer twice on the Tony Awards. She has been featured in advertisements for M&M's, Old Navy, CheapTickets.com, and I Can't Believe It's Not Butter!

Mullally guest-starred as an adoption case worker for Liz Lemon in the third season premiere of the NBC sitcom 30 Rock and returned to play the same character two additional times during the show's run. Other appearances include Kathy Griffin: My Life on the D-List, Campus Ladies, director/actor David Wain's "Wainy Days", an episode of HBO's Funny or Die, and the Funny or Die web video "That's What She Said".

Mullally has guest-starred seven times as Tammy Swanson on the NBC series Parks and Recreation, in the episodes "Ron and Tammy", "Ron & Tammy: Part Two", "Li'l Sebastian", "Ron and Tammys", "The Trial of Leslie Knope", "Ron and Diane", "Ron and Jammy", and "A Parks and Recreation Special". Mullally plays the role of the second ex-wife of the character Ron Swanson, who is played by her real-life husband, Nick Offerman. Offerman also had two different roles on a couple episodes of Mullally's show Will & Grace, playing a plumber and chef.

Also in 2009, Mullally starred in the ABC sitcom In the Motherhood. Based on the original web series, the television adaptation focuses on three mothers. She played Rosemary opposite Cheryl Hines and Jessica St. Clair. The series was poorly received and was canceled by ABC due to low ratings after airing five out of seven episodes produced.

Mullally co-starred in 2010 as Lydia on the Starz ensemble series Party Down. Mullally co-starred as "Chief" on the Adult Swim series Childrens Hospital. In 2011, Mullally began a recurring role as Dana Hartz, the mother of Penny (Casey Wilson), on the ABC sitcom Happy Endings. In the following months, Mullally joined the series Breaking In for its second season in 2012, after which the show was canceled.

Also in 2012, Mullally joined the first season of Bob's Burgers as Aunt Gayle. She reprised the role in subsequent episodes along with several minor roles.

Mullally rejoined the Will & Grace cast as Karen upon the show's revival, which ran for three seasons from 2017 to 2019.

Mullally helped discover comedic actor Bill Hader, encouraging Lorne Michaels to give him a Saturday Night Live audition after seeing him in an improvisation showcase.

Theatre 

Mullally made her Broadway debut as Marty in the 1994 revival of Grease, and subsequently appeared as Rosemary in the hit 1995 revival of How to Succeed in Business Without Really Trying opposite Matthew Broderick. In 2007, Mullally starred as Elizabeth in Mel Brooks' original Broadway musical Young Frankenstein. She can be heard on the cast albums of all three productions.

In 1996, she starred in You Never Know at the Pasadena Playhouse. Mullally appeared in 2000 as Pamela in the multiple award-winning production of Chuck Mee's The Berlin Circle, for which she won both the LA Weekly Theatre Award and the Backstage West Garland Award. Mullally starred as Beverly in the acclaimed production of Adam Bock's The Receptionist at the Odyssey Theatre (notably, the longest sold-out run of a show in that theatre's history), for which she was awarded the 2010 Backstage West Garland Award for Best Performance by an Actress.

From April 13 to June 1, 2014, Mullally starred alongside her real-life husband, Nick Offerman, in Annapurna at the off-Broadway Acorn Theatre on New York's 42nd Street Theatre Row.

In 2014 Mullally starred in the Broadway performance of It's Only a Play with F. Murray Abraham, Matthew Broderick, Stockard Channing, Rupert Grint, Nathan Lane and Micah Stock. The show opened at the Gerald Schoenfeld Theatre on October 9, 2014, and played through January 18, 2015. It then opened at the Bernard B. Jacobs Theatre on January 23, 2015, and closed on June 7, 2015. The show played 48 previews and 274 performances.

In June 2021, Mullally was set to appear as "Reno Sweeney" in Anything Goes at the Barbican Theatre in London for a strictly limited season, but had to pull out due to an injury.

Music 
Mullally is a member of the band Supreme Music Program. SMP has released three albums: The Sweetheart Break-In, Big as a Berry and Free Again!.

Mullally and Stephanie Hunt formed the band Nancy & Beth in 2012. They went on tour in March 2013, along with Mullally's husband, Nick Offerman.

Nancy & Beth performed at Lincoln Center as part of its American Songbook Series on February 13, 2019, and toured the US in April and May 2019, beginning in Los Angeles and ending in New York City. The band subsequently toured Australia in June 2019, beginning in Hobart and ending in Brisbane.

Film 
Mullally has appeared in Marc Forster's Sundance competition entry Everything Put Together, Anywhere but Here with Susan Sarandon and Natalie Portman, About Last Night with Demi Moore and Rob Lowe, Speaking of Sex with James Spader, and Stealing Harvard with Tom Green and Jason Lee. Mullally played a singing teacher in the 2009 film remake of Fame, and can be heard on the soundtrack recording. Additionally, Mullally sang the song "Long John Blues" (performed on-screen by Kristen Bell) in 2010's Burlesque. She played one of the leads' mothers in the 2013 indie film The Kings of Summer and Mrs. Van Camp in the movie G.B.F. Mullally played Barb Fleming in the 2016 film Why Him? In 2017, Mullally appeared in Janicza Bravo's first full-length feature, Lemon, which debuted at Sundance Film Festival.

In August 2021, Bleecker Street and Stage 6 Films picked up the worldwide rights to James Ponsoldt's coming of age film Summering, starring Mullally alongside Sarah Cooper.

Published works 
Mullally and husband Nick Offerman wrote The Greatest Love Story Ever Told, published by Dutton on October 2, 2018. The book is a New York Times Bestseller. The two reveal the full story behind their romance in chapters on religion, family, and more.

Personal life 
Mullally's first marriage, October 31, 1982, was to James Thomas Hines.

Mullally's second marriage, in the mid-1990s, was to talent agent Michael Katcher.

Mullally met actor and future husband Nick Offerman in 2000 while acting in The Berlin Circle, a play produced by the Evidence Room Theatre Company, and they married three years later in 2003. While they were dating, Offerman appeared in a guest role on Will & Grace, in a 2001 Thanksgiving episode (season 4, episode 10, "Moveable Feast, Part 2"). Offerman appeared again, in a different role, in the season 9 (2018) episode "Friends and Lover". The couple have also appeared together in films such as The Kings of Summer and Smashed and the television series Parks and Recreation, and they also performed voice work together in Bob's Burgers, Hotel Transylvania 2, and The Great North. In 2019, they launched the podcast In Bed with Nick and Megan, discussing their personal lives and interviewing guests.

Filmography

Film

Television

Awards and nominations

References 

 Megan Mullally, Biography Resource Center Online. Gale Group, 1999.
 Jamie Painter Young, Clowning Glory. Back Stage. 19 Dec. 2003: B-38.

External links 

 
 
 
 
 

1958 births
Living people
20th-century American actresses
21st-century American actresses
American musical theatre actresses
American television actresses
Television personalities from Los Angeles
American women television personalities
American women singers
American film actresses
American female dancers
American dancers
American women comedians
American voice actresses
American women podcasters
American podcasters
American people of English descent
American people of Irish descent
American ballerinas
American LGBT rights activists
Actresses from Los Angeles
Actresses from Oklahoma City
Musicians from Oklahoma City
Outstanding Performance by a Supporting Actress in a Comedy Series Primetime Emmy Award winners
Outstanding Performance by a Female Actor in a Comedy Series Screen Actors Guild Award winners
Activists from California
Activists from Oklahoma
Comedians from California
Comedians from Oklahoma
Singers from Los Angeles
Singers from Oklahoma
20th-century American comedians
21st-century American comedians